Sunny Viswanath is an Indian composer and music producer.

Early life
He started learning music at the age of 4 and performing with amateur bands since the age of 7. By the age of 14, he was into professional music. Sunny learned seven instruments

Career

Personal life
He is married to Priya Viswanath and is settled in Ayyanthole, Thrissur.

References

1971 births
Living people
Indian film score composers
Indian record producers
Musicians from Kozhikode
Kendriya Vidyalaya alumni